Henry Singer is a  documentary filmmaker. Born in 1957, he holds a bachelor's degree from Harvard University and a master's degree from Cambridge University. He produced the documentary 9/11: The Falling Man which dealt with the attempts to name an individual who jumped to his death from the World Trade Center following the 9/11 attacks. His work has a BAFTA nomination and a New York film festival gold medal.

He produced the documentary Last Orders as part of the BBCs White season.

Singer's The Blood of the Rose won the Green Award at Sheffield Doc/Fest.

See also
Trial of Ratko Mladić

References

External links

1957 births
Living people
American documentary filmmakers
Harvard University alumni